Bishan MRT station is a Mass Rapid Transit (MRT) interchange station on the North South (NSL) and Circle (CCL) lines in Bishan, Singapore. Located along Bishan Road within the town centre area, it is integrated with the Junction 8 shopping centre and close to the Bishan Bus Interchange. Nearby schools include Raffles Institution, Catholic High School and the Kuo Chuan Presbyterian Primary and Secondary Schools.

Initially announced as Kampung San Teng, it was renamed San Teng and subsequently Bishan. Opened on 7 November 1987, Bishan NSL station was one of the first five stations on the MRT network. During the construction of the CCL station, the original island platform of the NSL was split into two separate side platforms and the station was upgraded to cope with increased passenger traffic from the CCL, which opened on 28 May 2009. In 2017, a major flood in the tunnels between this station and Braddell station disrupted train services on the NSL. The Bishan NSL station is the only ground-level station on the network, while the CCL station features an Art-in-Transit artwork Move! by Soh Ee Shaun. Due to the stations' location near a former cemetery, it has been alleged that the station is haunted.

History

North South line (1987)

Bishan station (then named Kampung San Teng) was one of the first stations to be included in the planning stages of the MRT network. The station was renamed to San Teng in November 1982 and would be built at a Chinese cemetery.

This was the first contract involving cut and cover construction awarded by the MRT Corporation (MRTC). On 21 September 1984, the MRT Corporation (MRTC) renamed San Teng station to Bishan station to reflect the name of the new housing estate that was being built around the site of the MRT station.

Structural works for Bishan station were completed on 23 October 1985. In January 1986, it was announced that the station would be opened in early 1988 as part of the first section of the MRT system from the Yio Chu Kang to Toa Payoh stations. It was later announced in September 1987 that the section would open on 7 November that year.

In an effort to familiarise people with the system, the station opened for a preview from 24 to 25 October. As announced, the station was one of the first MRT stations on the network to be opened for service on 7 November 1987.

Circle MRT line and further upgrades (2008-09)

The contract also included upgrading the NSL station. Construction was slated to start in the third quarter of 2003 and was expected to be completed by early 2008.

The original NSL station underwent major alterations to handle increased passenger traffic when the CCL station opened. A new air-conditioned platform to serve southbound trains to Marina South Pier was constructed to increase the passenger capacity of the station from 1,250 to 2,020. The new platform, Platform B, opened for service on 27 July 2008. As the original platform, now serving northbound trains to Jurong East, remained in service, upgrading works for the platform (Platform A) were hindered and took about a year to complete. While the re-tiling of the platform was done during the day, the Platform Screen Doors (PSDs) were installed in sections through the night. An air-conditioning system was also installed as part of the upgrade. Upgrading works for the platform were fully completed on 23 May 2009. An additional entrance to the basement of Junction 8 was also built. Along with the other Stage 3 CCL stations, the CCL station was opened on 28th of that month.

These are insulated with noise absorptive materials such as rock wool, which helped reduce noise volume by about 5 decibels. The NSL station underwent another upgrade in 2016 with the repositioning of seats at the platforms to allow more space and seats for commuters.

Incidents
On 28 July 2004, a 31 year old accountant died after falling on the track in front of an oncoming train at this station, disrupting northbound train services for an hour. On September 15 the same year, an elderly man was the victim of a similar incident.

On 7 October 2017, during a heavy downpour in the afternoon, water got into a section of the tunnel between Bishan and Braddell MRT stations, disrupting NSL train services from Ang Mo Kio station to Marina South Pier for several hours. This was the first time in Singapore that train services were affected by water flooding into the tunnels. Separately, at about 5.55pm, a small fire sparked in the tunnel between the Marina Bay and Raffles Place stations, but it is not clear the fire, which was extinguished by itself, was linked to the flood, although electrical short circuits caused by water had sparked tunnel fires before.

Train services between Marina South Pier and Newton resumed on the day itself at about 9.20pm. After overnight efforts by the Singapore Civil Defence Force (SCDF) to clear the water in the tunnels, train services between Newton and Ang Mo Kio stations resumed at 1.36pm the following day. This train disruption was one of the worst service disruptions in SMRT's history. Through investigations by the Land Transport Authority (LTA), it was discovered that the overflowing in the tunnel was caused by a malfunction in the poor-maintained water pumping system, which has since been repaired. SMRT Trains, who operate the NSL, were fined a combined S$1.9 million (US$ million) for this incident and the Pasir Ris rail accident, and subsequently laid off eight workers involved in the incident due to their negligence by falsifying maintenance records and not maintaining the pumps.

Location and name
As the name suggests, the station is located in the Singapore neighbourhood of Bishan along Bishan Road. The name Bishan is the Mandarin pronunciation of Peck San. Peck San, in turn, was derived from the name of a large Cantonese burial ground Peck San Theng that used to cover the area.

The station is situated near the retail development of Junction 8 and other public amenities such as the Bishan Public Library, CPF building, Bishan Neighbourhood Police Post, Bishan Stadium, Bishan Community Club and the Bishan Bus Interchange. It is also within walking distances to the schools of Catholic High School, Raffles Institution, Kuo Chuan Presbyterian School and the Ministry of Education Language Centre (Bishan).

Services
The station serves the North South (NSL) and Circle lines (CCL). The station code is NS17/CC15 as reflected on official maps. On the NSL, the station is located between the Ang Mo Kio and Braddell stations, while on the CCL, the station is located between the Lorong Chuan and Marymount stations. The NSL have headways of 2 to 5 minutes, while the CCL services have headways of 3.5 to 5 minutes.

Station design

The NSL station is the only ground-level station on the MRT network. The station was designed with an "open, sunken-plaza" concept allowing natural light onto the tracks. The station has a beige and brick coloured scheme with bougainvillaeas planted outside. During the construction of the CCL, the entrance was upgraded to "capture the essence" of the station being a "gateway" to Bishan. The rebuilt station has a "pyramidal" opened-top aluminium roof over the existing flat roof, allowing sunlight and ventilation into the station.

The retail stores around the station use glass panels which are chamfered at the corners, giving balance to the roof. The glass walls are separated from the roofline via a small space at the top such that the roof appears afloat. The paid area has a layered ceiling and design elements made of glass, giving it a spacious atmosphere. A glass canopy connects the station to the retail development of Junction 8.

Bishan CCL station is one of eleven stations along the Circle Line designated as Civil Defence (CD) shelters, which can be activated during national emergencies. Apart from reinforced construction, the stations are designed and equipped with facilities to ensure the environment is tolerable if the station is used as a shelter. These facilities include protective blast doors, decontamination facilities, ventilation systems, power and water supply systems and a dry toilet system.

Public artwork

Move!

The artwork Move! by Soh Ee Shaun is displayed at the CCL station as part of the network's Art-in-Transit programme. The artwork consists of three murals –  The Family, The Scientist and The Heartland – each of which is made of 16 glass panels, all cast in film. The artwork reflects the artist's view of the "mindless rush of commuters" through the station. The Family, a  mural mainly in yellow and black, depicts ordinary activities that are part of Singapore's "air-conditioned" lifestyle. The Scientist portrays "larger-than-life" scientists surrounded by modern technology such as rockets, robots and fighter jets; this mural is designed in blue and black on a  canvas. The Heartland, on a  panel, represents the neighbourhood of Bishan, with the area's notable landmarks against a pink backdrop.

The artist was one of the youngest to be commissioned for artwork on the CCL. He was selected to design the art at Bishan as it was believed his dynamic drawings would be engaging to the youth and families in the town. Soh initially planned to create an abstract work of people moving around to reflect the bustle of a train station. However, it was thought to be "too literal" and Karen Lim, the curator who was guiding the artist in his work, urged Soh to incorporate thematic stories into the work.

Reflecting Lim's advice, each of the three art walls adopted a subject matter. Soh could not find inspiration from his first visit to Bishan and instead drew up murals centred on general life in Singapore – Garden Circus, The Control Room and The Living Room. The latter two developed into The Scientist and The Family respectively. Garden Circus, however, which illustrated the "pace of life" in Singapore, was withdrawn as it was considered "not strong enough conceptually". To overcome his mental block, the artist made another trip to Bishan and found inspiration for The Heartland. Though these artworks cover different subject matter, all express the artist's "silly and illogical" style. Usually, Soh's drawings are spontaneous, with the concepts produced "as an afterthought". In this work, however, Soh first devised various drafts and determined how to fuse the different parts into the final product. Being aware that his work would be a long-term feature of the station, Soh deeply considered the objects of his illustrations so that his work would remain relevant throughout time.

The work was reproduced digitally and enlarged to fit on the walls. Soh inspected each of the panels shipped from overseas and oversaw the installation of his work in the station, working with the station architects and production team. As a tribute to them, the artist included depictions of workers with construction hats in The Heartland. Soh was grateful for the guidance from the curator, as this was one of his first major works: Soh had started drawing seriously two years prior. The curator suggested the artist "tone down" his murals to avoid the viewers being "drawn away" from the narratives. Lim also provided guidance towards finalising the design, as Soh kept inserting more features and altering the work. Soh reflected that the work allowed him to mature as an artist, and he expressed hope that the work would "liven up" the plain environment of the station and provide something fresh to the commuters and brighten up their day.

Art Seats

The CCL station features two sets of Art Seats designed to enhance the commuters' experience on the line yet functional. Two entries, both by Lui Honfay and Yasmine Chan, were selected through the International Art Seats Design Competition in 2006. The first entry – Matrix, which received the top prize in the international competition – consists of a series of benches engraved with the station name in a dot-matrix style on the seat surface. The dot-matrix system was used as it was flexible enough to be mass-produced for use in many stations. Another entry, Rain, showcases steel seats in the shape of water puddles instead of the ordinary stone seats in other MRT stations. The design of the seats was intended to include a "natural element in an abstract matter".

Cultural impact
Being located on the former burial site of the Peck San Theng, the station is rumoured to be haunted. Tales of headless figures alighting and boarding at the station are well-known, with one version mentioning about a ghost sitting in the last car with its decapitated head on the adjacent seat. Such tales likely originated from the Kwong Wai Siew Peck San Theng columbarium, which now houses 45,000 urns, according to the Singapore Paranormal Investigators (SPI). In response to calls and letters from light-night passengers claiming to witness headless ghosts at the station, The New Paper went to investigate in October 1988 but did not uncover any ghosts. The MRTC, the operator of the station, has said the operations and their staff have not been impacted by any alleged "sightings" but confirmed that the station was at the site of the former cemetery.

In April 2005, The Straits Times investigated and debunked several accounts of ghosts at the station. One account mentioned a passenger being in a late-night train which did not stop at the station. When the passenger confronted the driver, the driver claimed to witness ghosts at the station when he pointed out that he could seen more people than what the commuter could see. The station operator confirmed that trains do bypass stations at times, although usually these trains are empty. The operator added that the train could have bypassed the station when it failed to stop at the station "due to a technical fault". The Straits Times article also mentioned a first-hand account by a former civil servant who claimed to have passed out while taking the train in 1991. She claimed to have felt many groping hands before fainting after the train pulled out of Bishan station. In a field investigation, The Straits Times reported no encounters of any ghosts.

Notes and references

Notes

References

Bibliography

External links
 

Railway stations in Singapore opened in 1987
Mass Rapid Transit (Singapore) stations
Buildings and structures in Bishan, Singapore
Railway stations in Central Region, Singapore